Carlo Armiento (born 4 June 1999), is an Australian professional footballer who plays as a left winger for Brisbane Roar.

Career

Adelaide United
On 23 August 2018, Armiento signed his first professional contract with Adelaide United, penning a two-year scholarship deal with the club. He made his professional debut in a Round 7 clash with Melbourne Victory, replacing Apostolos Stamatelopoulos in the 80th minute as the Reds were defeated 2–0 at AAMI Park. Armiento was released on 12 December 2019.

Perth Glory
Carlo was announced as a Perth Glory player on 5 February 2020, having been signed as a free agent following his release from Adelaide.

He first appeared with Perth in their quarter-final clash against Wellington Phoenix which Glory won 2-0 as an unused substitute, and again four days later against Sydney FC as they lost the match 2–0, once again not coming off the bench.

Armiento got his first minutes of football for Glory on 30 November 2020 after coming on as a substitute against Shanghai Shenhua in their Asian Champions League campaign in the 57th minute, and marked his debut by scoring a free-kick in a game which ended 3-3.

On 20 January 2021, Armiento made his A-League debut for the Glory in their first game of the season, coming on as a substitute in the sixty-ninth minute. He scored his first A-League goal from close range to make the score 5–1 to Perth against Adelaide United, his former club; the match resulted in a 5–3 win for Perth.

References

External links

1999 births
Living people
Australian soccer players
Association football forwards
Adelaide United FC players
Perth Glory FC players
Adelaide City FC players
Brisbane Roar FC players
A-League Men players
National Premier Leagues players
Australian people of Italian descent